The athletics at the 1977 Southeast Asian Games was held at the Merdeka Stadium, Kuala Lumpur, Malaysia.

Medal summary

Men

Women

Medal table

References

South East Asian Games. GBR Athletics. Retrieved on 2010-12-16.

1977
Athletics
Southeast Asian Games
International athletics competitions hosted by Malaysia